Michael Bird may refer to:

 Michael Bird (politician), economics lecturer and member of the Colorado State Senate, 1984–1994
 Michael Bird (author) (born 1958), British author and art historian
 Michael Bird (bishop) (born 1957), Canadian Anglican bishop
 Michael Bird (theologian) (born 1974), Australian New Testament scholar
 Michael Bird (footballer) (born 1983), English former footballer
 Michael J. Bird (1928–2001), English writer

See also
 Mickey Bird (born 1958), Japanese manga artist